The America was a non-rigid airship built by Mutin Godard in France in 1906 for the journalist Walter Wellman's attempt to reach the North Pole by air. Wellman first conceived of using a balloon to fly to the pole during a failed polar attempt by boat and sledge from Svalbard in 1894. He then visited Paris to review the state of balloon technology but left disappointed by the lack of acceptable steering and propulsion capability. A decade later while at the 1905 Portsmouth Peace Conference he learned of recent innovations in French dirigible design and believed a solution might be at hand for his Arctic aerial plan. After receiving the backing of newspaper publisher Victor F. Lawson, the Wellman Chicago Record-Herald Polar Expedition was announced, and Wellman traveled to Paris in search of a suitable design and manufacturer. In the meantime a public company was established to raise the $US 250,000 required for the expedition and airship (to which Lawson contributed $60,000).

The envelope was of three layers of fabric and three of rubber, and contained no internal framework. It was delivered by ship to Spitsbergen on July 8, 1906, where Wellman and his team attempted to erect it. Their efforts met with failure when the engines fell apart. In September, the America was dismantled and returned by ship to France.

Wellman returned to Spitsbergen with the America in June the following year, 1907. The weather was very unfavourable, however, and it was 2 September before the America could even leave the hangar. Wasting no time, Wellman launched later that day with mechanic Melvin Vaniman and navigator Felix Riesenberg in an attempt to reach the pole. Unfortunately, more bad weather forced this to be abandoned after only a few miles and the America was deflated to avoid a crash landing. America once again returned to France for repairs.

She returned to Spitsbergen one more time in July 1909, and at 10 AM on 15 August, launched with Wellman, Vaniman, Russian balloonist Nicolas Popov and Vaniman's brother-in-law Albert Louis Loud on board. The flight began well enough, but two hours and  later, a device Wellman called the "equilibrator" failed. This was a long, leather tube filled with ballast that was intended to help gauge and maintain a fixed altitude over the ice. The crew was rescued by the Norwegian steamer Farm. Wellman began plans to extend the hangar so that he could return the following year with a larger airship, but on learning of Dr. Frederick Cook's claim to have reached the pole, abandoned the adventure.

Instead, Wellman resolved to make the first aerial crossing of the Atlantic Ocean. A spark gap radio set was added to the underhanging life boat and operator Jack Irwin used it during the flight, callsign "W", and with the frame of the airship as the antenna. Given the hydrogen used for lifting the craft this was a very dangerous system. The unit made some of the very first air-to-ground transmissions, when the airship's engineer Melvin Vaniman sent one of the first aerial radio transmissions urging the launch boat to "come and get this goddam cat!" – the cat Kiddo who was (at first) not happy about being airborne.

On 15 October 1910, takeoff was made from Atlantic City. Condensing water on the airship's skin added excess weight, and it was difficult to gain height. A passing storm also made forward navigation difficult. The engines failed 38 hours into the flight, apparently due to contamination by beach sand, and America drifted. The crew jettisoned all excess weight, including one of the defunct engines. The ship had gone as far as a point east of New Hampshire and south of Nova Scotia before floating generally south.

After attracting the ship's attention by a signaling lamp using Morse code, Irwin made the first aerial distress call by radio. The crew, and mascot cat Kiddo, got into the lifeboat and, after opening the gas valves on the airship, abandoned the America. The airship drifted out of sight and was never seen again. Trent, having barely avoided running down the lifeboat in a high crosswind, was able to rescue the crew and returned them to New York. The first successful aerial crossings of the Atlantic came nine years later.

See also

 Spitsbergen Airship Museum
 List of missing aircraft

References

Further reading

 Nelson, Stewart (1993) "Airships in the Arctic" Arctic 46 (3) 278–83.
 Robinson, Michael (2006) "The New Machines: Walter Wellman and Robert Peary" in The Coldest Crucible: Arctic Exploration and American Culture (University of Chicago Press)
 Arctic Postal History 1906–09
 Wellman's Obituary in Time magazine

Airships of the United States
Arctic exploration vessels
Bermuda Triangle
Missing aircraft